Temple Israel may refer to the following synagogues:

Canada:
Temple Israel (Ottawa)

United States:
Temple Israel of Hollywood (Los Angeles, California)
Temple Israel (Stockton, California)
Temple Israel (Leadville, Colorado)
Temple Israel (Westport, Connecticut)
Temple Israel (Lafayette, Indiana)
Temple Israel (Paducah, Kentucky)
Temple Israel (Boston, Massachusetts)
Temple Israel (West Bloomfield, Michigan)
Temple Israel (Minneapolis, Minnesota)
Congregation Temple Israel (Creve Coeur, Missouri)
Temple Israel of the City of New York
Temple Israel (Charlotte, North Carolina)
Temple Israel (Kinston, North Carolina)
Temple Israel (Columbus, Ohio)
Temple Israel (Dayton, Ohio)
Temple Israel (Tulsa, Oklahoma)
Temple Israel (Memphis, Tennessee)

See also
List of synagogues named Temple Israel
Temple of Israel (disambiguation)